Mian Talar Hoseyni (also Romanized as Mīān Ţālār Ḩoseynī) is a village in Deraz Kola Rural District, Babol Kenar District, Babol County, Mazandaran Province, Iran. At the 2006 census, its population was 55, in 12 families.

References 

Populated places in Babol County